Aeromonas tecta is a Gram-negative bacterium of the genus Aeromonas isolated from stool of a child with diarrhoea, a healthy patient, and environmental sources.

References

External links
Type strain of Aeromonas tecta at BacDive -  the Bacterial Diversity Metadatabase

Aeromonadales
Bacteria described in 2010